Eyzahut is a commune in the Drôme department in the Auvergne-Rhône-Alpes region in southeastern France. It is a rather touristic spot of the area in the summer, thanks to the natural scenery surrounding it and infrastructures built in the 1970s (public swimming pool, tennis court).

Population

See also
Communes of the Drôme department

References

Communes of Drôme